Lê Xuân Anh (born 26 July 1991) is a Vietnamese footballer who plays as a defender for V-League (Vietnam) club Thanh Hóa.

References

1993 births
Living people
Vietnamese footballers
Association football defenders
Thanh Hóa FC players
Haiphong FC players
V.League 1 players
People from Thanh Hóa province